The Trinity School in Nottingham, England is a Catholic secondary school and sixth form with academy status for pupils aged 11–18. It is part of the Our Lady of Lourdes Catholic Multi Academy Trust.

The School asserts that its main concerns are: 'academic excellence, good discipline and achievement in all the broader aspects of education within a happy and distinctively Catholic atmosphere'. In 2011 90% of students achieved 5 A*-C grades at GCSE level and 90% of students were accepted onto their 'first choice' course at university.

Admissions
The school is a faith school, and has restricted admissions. Its good academic results give it a high profile in the city, and places for the school will be limited. It is situated off Beechdale Road, a main thoroughfare, near the junction with Kingsbury Drive, between Beechdale (to the south-east), Aspley (to the east), and Bilborough (to the west). The area has many secondary schools, with Bluecoat Beechdale Campus neighbouring to the west, and Nottingham Academy for Girls nearby to the east. Woodlands School, a school for children with special needs, neighbours to the east. The north half of the school lies in Aspley, and the southern half is in Bilborough.

History

Former Schools
Bishop Dunn School was a co-educational secondary modern school on Kingsbury Drive, and named after Thomas Dunn. St Catherine's Convent School was at the Convent of Mercy on College Street in central Nottingham near Nottingham Cathedral from 1846, run by the Sisters of Mercy. It became a grammar school in 1951. It moved to Beechdale Road in 1962, becoming the Loreto Grammar School for Girls, a girls' Roman Catholic grammar school. The site on Beechdale Road was then run by the Sisters of Loreto, also known as the Institute of the Blessed Virgin Mary. It took in catholic girls from all over Nottingham and outside the city.

Comprehensive
It was formed in 1975 by the merger of the grammar school and secondary modern. The grammar school site is now the upper school.

Academy
The school converted to being an academy on 1 July 2012, and is no longer directly funded or governed by Nottingham City Council. However the school continues to co-operate with the council in regards to admissions.

Traditions

The school badge
The school badge, re-designed in 1988, encapsulates much of the school's credo and ideology. The cross is derived from the Bishop's cross. The fleur-de-lys represents the Loreto School and the Triangle the first symbol of The Trinity School. They are set in school colours of green, black, silver and gold. "Ad Dei Gloriam", their motto ("To the Glory of God"), sums up the driving ideology of the school.

Houses
In year 7 pupils are allocated into four different houses who compete against each other in a range of activities: most notably the annual athletics competition and sports day. The school runs House competitions such as House Debate, Inter-house Drama, Modern Foreign Languages and Piano recitals.

The 4 houses are named after Saints of the Catholic Church.

 St.Alphonsa
 St.Lorenzo
 St.Maximillian Kolbe
 St.Teresa of Avila

The Music Department
The school has a thriving music department, which is recognised nationally as being one of Nottinghamshire and the UK's finest in a comprehensive school. The music department encourages children of all ages, backgrounds and abilities to take up an instrument through its 'Orchestra' classes and also through an abundance of extra-curricular music ensembles led by music specialists. The school's Orchestra classes, which are a Trinity signature, offer every student in years 7 to 9 the ability to learn and play an instrument. Orchestra lessons offer violin, recorder and multi-instrumental tuition. The school's tradition of having such a special and inclusive music department has gained the school national acclaim and separates the school from competitors which has been recognised by high-profile musicians, composers and politicians. Music's tradition at Trinity has enabled current and ex students to progress in their academic and music careers; notably Sheku Kanneh-Mason, who became the first black winner of the BBC Young Musician of the Year competition in 2016.

The music department has a reputation for producing and helping towards some of the best results at A level in the school. The extra-curricular music offers are another feature that allows the school to stand out from the crowd, with groups on offer which include a brass band, concert band, chamber orchestra, senior and lower choirs, string ensembles, rock and blues band, guitar groups, music tech clubs and many more. The threat of funding cuts prompted ex-student Sheku Kanneh-Mason to donate £3,000 to save cello tuition at the school in 2017. Sheku said of the school "I have had amazing opportunities at Trinity School, and to see other children not have the same opportunities as I had would be a huge shame."

In 2020 former Trinity student Jacob Fowler, won the BBC Two TV show Little Mix: The Search with his band Since September. The band toured as the supporting artist for Little Mix on their UK tour in 2021.

Activities

Trinity School Show Band
The Trinity School Show Band was formed in 1997 as a traditional marching brass band with thirty eight members, developing into over a hundred members when it became a show band. They have taken part in competitions since 2001 when they entered the World Championships in Germany. They won the Colchester Band Contest trophy (Division Two) three times between 2006 and 2008. For the 2009 season, the band were placed in BYBA's top division. At BYBA finals, Trinity came first beating all the other bands in their division. Other awards include, Academy Brass 2006 (Division Two), National Championships (Division Two) in 2006 and 2007, and Ouse Valley Sounds MBC 2008 (Division Two).

Following a year away from competing, for the 2014 season, the show band competed in Division 2 of the British Youth Band Association and won the first show of the season, at Music Revolution in Bradford taking Music Effect, Music Analysis, Field Wind, Field Visual, Field Percussion and Colour Guard captions.

The Trinity School Show Band ceased to exist in 2017.

Academic performance

Trinity has achieved an outstanding academic reputation. Public examinations at KS3, KS4 and KS5 have all been to a very high standard. GCSE results have steadily improved, not just 5 A* to C benchmarks but also the numbers of higher grades including English and Maths. Each year most of the 100 or so Year 13 students leave with their first choice of University. [The actual raw data is on the DCSF performance tables web site, and the schools own web site]. This is coupled with excellent extra-curricular achievements in music, sport and adventure training which demonstrate the tenacity and ambition of the school. The school also works closely with its associated parishes, firmly within the Catholic ethos it seeks to promote. The school enjoys good support from parents and fosters excellent relationships with pupils, as is reflected and evidenced in the most recent Ofsted report of November 2008.

Although Nottingham has many poor performing secondary schools, it offers good results at GCSE, regularly having joint-best results for the LEA's schools, with Fernwood School. Fernwood, similar to many secondary schools in Nottingham, does not have a sixth form. Trinity is the only 11–18 school in Nottingham to get above-average results at A-level, except the independent (fee-paying) Nottingham High School and Nottingham High School for Girls. Many schools in Nottingham have recently become academies.

Notable alumni
 Paul McMahon left Trinity in 2001 to read for a law degree at Oxford University. He plays international cricket and is currently in South Africa.
 Kim Vithana, actress
 Sheku Kanneh-Mason, 2016 BBC Young Musician of the Year.
 Rob Green, vocalist who performed at BBC Prom 57 (the Swing Prom) 2017
 Leon Best, Republic of Ireland international footballer
 Robert Lachowicz, Professional ice hockey forward who currently plays with Nottingham Panthers.
Isata Kanneh-Mason, semi-finalist BBC Young Musician of the Year, 2014
Jacob Fowler, winner of the BBC One series Little Mix The Search
 Risteard McDonald, Head of Equalities for the Probation Service in England and Wales and previously both the political adviser for BlackLivesMatter UK and a political journalist, having written for LYRA Magazine, Raw Forms, Schön, and the London Student.

Loreto Convent School
 Jo Cleary, Chair since 2012 of the National Skills Academy for Social Care, and since 2013 of the College of Social Work

St Catherine's Convent of Mercy Grammar School
 Commandant Nursing Officer Jane Titley CBE, Director of the Defence Nursing Services from 1992 to 1995, and Matron-in-Chief from 1990 to 1994 of the Queen Alexandra's Royal Naval Nursing Service

Convent of Mercy School
 Teresa Helena Higginson

Teachers
Matt Shenton is the current Headteacher, with Mike Griffin as Deputy Headteacher. Assistant Headteachers are Rupert Bennett, Caroline McGrath, Steven Wadsley and Dan Kelly.

See also
 Loreto Grammar School, girls' grammar school in Altrincham

References

External links

News items
 Telegraph April 2007

Catholic secondary schools in the Diocese of Nottingham
Secondary schools in Nottingham
Educational institutions established in 1975

1975 establishments in England
Academies in Nottingham